The 35th of May, or Conrad's Ride to the South Seas (Der 35. Mai oder Konrad reitet in die Südsee in German, its original language) is a novel by Erich Kästner, first published in 1931. Unlike most of Kästner's other works - set in a completely realistic contemporary Germany - the present book is a work of fantasy and satire.

In his preface to the 1928 Emil and the Detectives Kästner recounts that he intended to write a humorous South Sea adventure story, but got stuck with the concrete details and finally followed the advice of a friend to write instead a book set in the familiar Berlin reality. Several of the plot details and characters briefly mentioned where Kästner describes his aborted fantasy were taken up in "35th of May", written four years later.

Plot introduction
The novel is about Conrad, a young boy, who spends each Thursday afternoon with his uncle, Mr. Ringelhuth. One Thursday — it happens to be the 35th of May — they meet Negro Caballo, a black horse that can speak, is well-versed in German literature, and at the same time, is the best roller skater in the world. Together they enter Mr. Ringelhuth's huge wardrobe, which stands in the hallway, and end up in a series of magical lands, starting with the land of Cockaigne ("free entry — children half price"), followed by a medieval castle complete with jousting, an upside-down world in which children send bad parents to reform school, a science fiction nightmare city with mobile phones and moving walkways, and a South Sea island. On his return to the real world, Conrad writes a school essay about his experiences.

The plot device of a magic wardrobe through which the characters enter magical lands anticipates the similar device used by C. S. Lewis in The Lion, the Witch and the Wardrobe, and, earlier, in the 1912 short story by E. Nesbit, "The Aunt and Amabel" — in which a girl enters a magic world through a wardrobe. (Critics accept that this was Lewis's inspiration.)

References 

1931 German novels
1931 children's books
1931 fantasy novels
Novels by Erich Kästner
German children's novels
Children's fantasy novels
Novels set in Oceania